

Major groups
 List of marginocephalian type specimens
 List of ornithopod type specimens
 List of other ornithischian type specimens
 List of sauropodomorph type specimens
 List of Mesozoic theropod type specimens
 List of thyreophoran type specimens